Alvaldi (Saturn LXV), provisionally known as S/2004 S 35, is a natural satellite of Saturn. Its discovery was announced by Scott S. Sheppard, David C. Jewitt, and Jan Kleyna on October 8, 2019 from observations taken between December 12, 2004 and February 25, 2006. It was given its permanent designation in August 2021. On 24 August 2022, it was officially named after Alvaldi, a jötunn from Norse mythology. He was very rich in gold, and when he died his sons divided his inheritance by taking a mouthful each.

Alvaldi is about 5 kilometres in diameter, and orbits Saturn at an average distance of 22.412 Gm in 1253.08 days, at an inclination of 177° to the ecliptic, in a retrograde direction and with an eccentricity of 0.194.

References

Norse group
Irregular satellites
Moons of Saturn
Discoveries by Scott S. Sheppard
Astronomical objects discovered in 2019
Moons with a retrograde orbit